Sir Robert Henry Bruce-Gardner (10 June 1943 - 6 September 2017) was an art conservator at the Courtauld Institute of Art and expert in the use of X-Rays in examining paintings.

See also
 Bruce-Gardner baronets

References 

1943 births
2017 deaths
Baronets in the Baronetage of the United Kingdom
Academics of the Courtauld Institute of Art
English art historians